Janet Carroll (December 24, 1940 – May 22, 2012) was an American film, stage and television character actress.

Carroll's career spanned more than four decades and included major and supporting roles in Broadway musicals, television and Hollywood films. She is perhaps best-known for her portrayal of the oblivious mother of Joel (Tom Cruise) in the 1983 film Risky Business.

Early life
Carroll was born Janet Carol Thiese in Chicago, the daughter of Hilda Catherine (née Patton) and George Nicholas Thiese. She received formal theatrical training and began acting professionally in the late 1960s, appearing in numerous productions in local theaters. She then became a regular at Starlight Theatre in Kansas City, Missouri, where she acted during five seasons.

She began classical training at age 12 with Dr. Greta Allum in Chicago. Over the years she continued building and expanding her voice and repertoire in formal study with Douglas Susu-Mago. With a fluent -octave vocal range, she was able to sing everything from opera to jazz and Broadway style to gospel music and Dixieland genre.

Carroll sang as a first soprano with the Canterbury Choral Society at Carnegie Hall and other venues across New York City.

Career 
Carroll then performed in Kansas City and Chicago, assuming significant roles in such musicals as Carousel, Guys and Dolls, Gypsy, Hello, Dolly!, Mame, South Pacific and The Pajama Game, before moving to California, where she continued her stage work, winning a Drama-Logue Award for her performance as Klytemnestra in Ezra Pound’s Elektra.

Besides Risky Business, Carroll appeared in more than 20 other films over the next three decades, including Secret Admirer (1985), The Killing Time (1987), Memories of Me (1988), Family Business (1989), Talent for the Game (1991), Destiny Turns on the Radio (1995), Forces of Nature (1999), The Omega Code and Enough (2002), among others. She developed her television career with recurring roles on the series Hill Street Blues (1983, 1986 as Peggy LaRue Nelson), The Bronx Zoo (1987 as Carol Danzig), Murphy Brown (1990–96, as Doris Dial, stoic anchorman Charles Kimbrough's wife), Melrose Place (1993–97, as Marion Shaw, Kimberly's mother), Married... with Children (1994–97, as Gary, Al Bundy's boss), and Still Standing (2002–04, as Helen Michaels).

From 2004 to 2005, she starred on Broadway creating the role of "Aunt March" in the original musical Little Women, which is based in the 1869 novel of the same title written by American author Louisa May Alcott. She promoted brands such as Century 21, Diet Coke, Outback Steakhouse and Holiday Inn, among others, in television advertisement spots.

Since 1982, she had performed as a singer at Jazz Festivals throughout the United States and Canada, being accompanied by her seven-piece format, while interpreting traditional jazz, swing, blues, and classic ballads or the Great American Songbook. She performed in Victoria and Vancouver summer festivals in British Columbia, as well as in Monterey, Los Angeles, Newport Beach, Santa Catalina Island, and New Orleans stages, along with concerts at United Service Organizations shows, the Palmer House in Chicago, the Fountainebleu in Miami Beach, the Ritz-Carlton chain, the Biltmore Hotel in Coral Gables and the San Antonio River Walk. At the Redding Jazz Festival, she was honored with an award for Best Vocalist. In 2004, she was the featured performer at the Porrath Foundation for Cancer Patient Advocacy Event tribute to film star Rhonda Fleming.

After twelve years of formal training Janet Carroll was ordained and licensed at the West Los Angeles' Church of Inner Light. An active participant in social issues, Carroll was a longstanding member of the Screen Actor's Guild and American Federation of Radio Artists and Actors Equity Association. She also served as the Artistic Director of The Jazz Series at Simi Valley's Cultural Arts Center. She was a V.P. on the executive board of directors of the Society of Singers and founder and co-chair of the Victory Ball in Westport, Connecticut.

In 1992, Carroll collaborated as a singer on the album This Joint Is Jumpin' Live! – Beverly Hills Unlisted Jazz Band, a recording project led by dixieland trombonist and actor Conrad Janis. She later released her solo albums Presenting... Janet Carroll and the Hollywood Jazz Cats (1992), I Can't Give You Anything But Love (2000), I'll Be Seeing You (2000) and Lady Be Good (2010).

By 2011, she was preparing the production of her fourth and fifth records titled A Tribute to the Great Ladies of Song! and Scorch Your Shorts Torch Songs!. She was diagnosed with brain cancer later that year and took a leave of absence. She underwent surgery and chemotherapy without success.
She had two sons George and Tom Brown. Tom predeceased her in 1978.

Death
Carroll died on May 22, 2012, from brain cancer at her home in Manhattan, aged 71.

Filmography

Film

Television

References

External links
J. Cast Productions

1940 births
2012 deaths
American film actresses
American musical theatre actresses
American sopranos
American stage actresses
American television actresses
Actresses from Chicago
Deaths from brain cancer in the United States
21st-century American women